Milano Greco Pirelli railway station is one of the main stations serving the comune of Milan.  Opened in 1914, it is in the north of the city, in the quartiere of Greco. It is on the Milan–Monza railway.

The station is currently managed by Rete Ferroviaria Italiana (RFI). Train services are operated by Trenitalia. Each of these companies is a subsidiary of Ferrovie dello Stato Italiane (FS), Italy's state-owned rail company.

The station is located on Via Roberto Cozzi, in the southeastern part of Greco.

History
The station was opened on 29 March 1914.  At that time, it was located in the then comune of Greco Milanese (annexed to Milan in 1923).

The station had for decades served the nearby Pirelli factories, until their disposal at the end of the twentieth century. The disposal was followed by a strong urban development leading to the new modern district, designed by the architect Vittorio Gregotti.  Inside the new district are the new University of Milan Bicocca and the Teatro degli Arcimboldi.

The next major station to the north is Sesto San Giovanni.  To the south are Milano Centrale and Milano Lambrate. Since 1966, the station has also been connected to Milano Porta Garibaldi through a newly built tunnel. The tunnel portal is to the south of Mirabello, near Piazza Carbonari (the so-called Passantino).

Train services

Suburban lines
  Lecco ↔ Milano Porta Garibaldi
  Lecco ↔ Milano Porta Garibaldi
  Saronno ↔ Albairate-Vermezzo
  Chiasso ↔ Milano Porta Garibaldi

Interchange
The station offers interchange with tram line 7, urban bus lines 52, 81, 86 and 87, and interurban bus 728.

See also

Railway stations in Milan
History of rail transport in Italy
Rail transport in Italy
Railway stations in Italy

References

External links

Description and pictures of Milano Greco Pirelli railway station 

Greco Pirelli
Railway stations opened in 1914
Milan S Lines stations
1914 establishments in Italy
Railway stations in Italy opened in the 20th century